The 1916 Iowa Hawkeyes football team represented the University of Iowa as a member of the Western Conference during the 1916 college football season. Led by first-year head coach Howard Jones, the Hawkeyes compiled an overall record of 4–3 with a mark of 1–2 in conference play, placing sixth in the Western Conference. The team played home games at Iowa Field in Iowa City, Iowa.

Schedule

References

Iowa
Iowa Hawkeyes football seasons
Iowa Hawkeyes football